Camellia species like tea (Camellia sinensis) are used as food plants by the caterpillars of a number of Lepidoptera (butterflies and moths).

These include:

 Coleophoridae
 Several Coleophora case-bearers, such as:
 C. scaleuta – recorded on tea (C. sinensis)
 C. vigilis – recorded on tea (C. sinensis)
 Geometridae
 Ectropis crepuscularia (the engrailed) – recorded on Japanese camellia (C. japonica)
 Hemithea aestivaria (common emerald) – recorded on snow camellia (C. rusticana) and possibly others
 Peribatodes rhomboidaria (willow beauty) – Leaves – recorded on tea (C. sinensis)
 Hepialidae
 Endoclita malabaricus – recorded on tea (C. sinensis)
 Endoclita punctimargo – recorded on tea (C. sinensis)
 Endoclita purpurescens – recorded on tea (C. sinensis)
 Endoclita sericeus – recorded on tea (C. sinensis)
 Noctuidae
 Agrotis segetum (turnip moth)

External links 

Camellia
+Lepidoptera